Ted Sanders (born 1969) is an American writer. He is the author of the short story collection No Animals We Could Name (Graywolf Press), which won the 2011 Bakeless Prize. He is also the author of The Keepers, a fantasy series for middle-grade readers published by HarperCollins. The first book of the series, The Box and the Dragonfly, was published in March 2015. The Harp and the Ravenvine was released in March 2016, and The Portal and the Veil was published in September 2017. The fourth and final book of the series, The Starlit Loom, was published in November 2018.

Life
In 2012, Sanders received a Literature Fellowship from the National Endowment for the Arts. His short story "Obit" was included in the 2010 O. Henry Prize Stories anthology. His short stories and essays have appeared in the Georgia Review, Gettysburg Review, Cincinnati Review, Southern Review, and elsewhere.

A native of northern Illinois, Sanders is an assistant professor of English at the University of Illinois, Urbana-Champaign, where he teaches creative writing.

References

External links
 Ted Sanders website 
 University of Illinois faculty page
 New York Times Sunday Book Review, May 8, 2015
 Publishers Weekly Review: The Box and the Dragonfly

University of Illinois alumni
National Endowment for the Arts Fellows
1969 births
Living people